Fifth is the ordinal form of the number five.

Fifth or The Fifth may refer to:
 Fifth Amendment to the United States Constitution, as in the expression "pleading the Fifth"
 Fifth column, a political term
 Fifth disease, a contagious rash that spreads in school-aged children
 Fifth force, a proposed force of nature in addition to the four known fundamental forces
 Fifth (Stargate), a robotic character in the television series Stargate SG-1
 Fifth (unit), a unit of volume used for distilled beverages in the U.S.
 Fifth-generation programming language
 1st Battalion, 5th Marines
 The fraction 1/5
 The royal fifth (Spanish and Portuguese), an old royal tax of 20%

Music
 A musical interval (music); specifically, a
 perfect fifth
 diminished fifth
 augmented fifth
 Quintal harmony, in which chords concatenate fifth intervals (rather than the third intervals of tertian harmony)
 Fifth (chord)
 A chord (music), member separated from the chord's root by one of the above fifth-intervals
 The dominant (music) or fifth diatonic scale degree, and the chord built on it
Musical compositions
 Symphony No. 5 (Beethoven),  commonly referred to as Beethoven's Fifth
 Fifth (Soft Machine album), 1972
 The Fifth (Bad Boys Blue album), 1989
 The Fifth (Dizzee Rascal album), 2013
 The Fifth (Obie Trice album), 2019
 5th (Lee Michaels album), 1971
 Fifth (The Autumn Defense album), 2014
 "Fifths" (song), a song by deadmau5
 The Fifth (band), a hard rock band from Fayetteville, North Carolina